Ivor Seward Richard, Baron Richard,  (30 May 1932 – 18 March 2018) was a British Labour politician who served as a member of Parliament (MP) from 1964 until 1974. He was also a member of the European Commission and latterly sat as a life peer in the House of Lords.

Education
Born in Cardiff, Wales, Ivor Richard was educated at St. Michael's School, an independent school in Llanelli, Carmarthenshire, followed by Cheltenham College, an independent school in Cheltenham, Gloucestershire, and Pembroke College at the University of Oxford.

Political career

1959–1974
Lord Richard had been an active member of the Labour Party and the Fabian Society since University and stood for Parliament in Kensington South in the general election of 1959. This was one of the most prosperous constituencies in the whole country, and he came third, but it was intended as no more than an opportunity to try his campaigning skills. For the 1964 election, Richard was adopted as candidate for Baron's Court, a highly marginal constituency between Hammersmith and Fulham. Baron's Court had seen knife-edge contests before, and the presence of the BBC television centre nearby ensured good media coverage.

Richard won the seat by just over 1,000 votes. In Parliament he served briefly as an assistant to Denis Healey as Secretary of State for Defence and was appointed as Minister for the Army in 1969. He was lucky to keep his seat despite the swing to the Conservatives in the 1970 election, and he became an opposition spokesman on telecommunications. He lost this job when he voted in favour of joining the European Communities (Common Market) in 1971, but was swiftly reappointed as a Foreign Affairs spokesman.

However, the Baron's Court seat was too small to survive the redistribution that took effect in 1974. Richard found it difficult to find a new seat, as pro-Europeanism was not popular within the Labour Party. He was eventually chosen at the last minute to fight Blyth against the sitting Labour MP who had been deselected in a row over his allegations of the corruption of the local Labour Party. With no background in the area and a popular opponent, Richard was defeated convincingly.

1974–1985
The incoming Labour Government appointed him in June 1974 as the UK Permanent Representative to the UN, where he served for five years. Richard played a role in trying to bring together the sides in the Middle East and Rhodesia conflicts. He became a figure of controversy after the then US Ambassador, Daniel Patrick Moynihan, criticised the UN for passing a resolution stating that Zionism was a form of racism, and Richard denounced him for behaving "like the Wyatt Earp of international politics"; shortly thereafter Moynihan was removed from office by Henry Kissinger.

Richard presided as chairman over the Geneva Conference on Rhodesia from 28 October to 14 December 1976. The conference was called to implement the terms of Henry Kissinger's agreement with Prime Minister Ian Smith of Rhodesia from the previous month on the creation of an interim government to preside. At the same time, a new majority-rule constitution was written. But the various African nationalists from Rhodesia refused to recognise the agreement and no progress was made during the six weeks of the conference. Smith was scathing in his treatment of Richard in his memoirs, citing Richard's "lack of integrity and courage" in failing to hold to the terms of the Kissinger agreement.

The incoming Conservative government in 1979 replaced Richard within months. However, in 1980 he was chosen by the Labour Party to take one of the posts on the European Commission (replacing Roy Jenkins). It was known that he was the Labour Party's third choice for the position: former Treasury Minister Joel Barnett had rejected an invitation, and the Conservative government had vetoed former Defence Secretary Fred Mulley. Richard took responsibility for Employment, Social Policy, Education and Training.

After 1985
Richard returned to Wales in 1985 and was appointed Chairman of World Trade Centre Wales Ltd., which tried to attract international investors for Welsh business. He unsuccessfully sought the Labour nomination for Cardiff West losing to Rhodri Morgan. In 1990, his name was included on a list of Labour Party 'Working Peers', and was created a life peer on 14 May 1990 taking the title Baron Richard, of Ammanford in the County of Dyfed and became an opposition spokesman in the House of Lords. His barrister's style led to his appointment as Leader of the Labour Peers from 1992, which brought with it appointment to the Privy Council. Richard led Labour in the Lords during their final spell in their near 20-year opposition before the landslide victory in 1997. Richard attempted to step up the Labour attack and in late 1993 pioneered an unprecedented (for the House of Lords) Motion of No Confidence in the Government, although he acknowledged it was a symbolic gesture and would not bring down the government, due to the primacy of the House of Commons.

When Labour won the 1997 election, Richard became Lord Privy Seal and Leader of the House of Lords. With Labour policy favouring a reform of the House starting with removing the hereditary peers, Richard began work on the new composition of the House but was shocked when he was suddenly removed at the first reshuffle in July 1998 to be replaced by Baroness Jay of Paddington. His thoughts on the reform of the House were published in Unfinished Business in 1999, and Richard became a critical friend of the Government.

Lord Richard latterly served as chairman of the parliamentary Joint Committee on the Draft House of Lords Reform Bill.

Death
Lord Richard died in Lambeth, London, in March 2018 at the age of 85.

Richard Commission
The Coalition Government in the National Assembly for Wales invited Richard to chair a commission on the future powers of the Assembly from 2002. The report was published on 31 March 2004 and recommended that the Assembly have full primary legislative powers in devolved areas from 2011, a recommendation that was controversial with Wales' Labour MPs.

References

External links
Debrett's People of Today
Richard Commission
Richard Commission final report

|-

|-

|-

|-

|-

|-

|-

1932 births
2018 deaths
Alumni of Pembroke College, Oxford
British European Commissioners
Labour Party (UK) life peers
Labour Party (UK) MPs for English constituencies
Leaders of the House of Lords
Lords Privy Seal
Members of the Privy Council of the United Kingdom
People educated at Cheltenham College
People educated at St Michael's School, Llanelli
Permanent Representatives of the United Kingdom to the United Nations
UK MPs 1964–1966
UK MPs 1966–1970
UK MPs 1970–1974
Welsh politicians
European Commissioners 1981–1985
Ministers in the Wilson governments, 1964–1970
Politicians from Cardiff
Life peers created by Elizabeth II